The 2001–02 season was Galatasaray's 98th in existence and the 44th consecutive season in the Süper Lig. This article shows statistics of the club's players in the season, and also lists all matches that the club have played in the season.

Squad statistics

Players in / out

In

Out

Süper Lig

Standings

Matches

Türkiye Kupası
Kick-off listed in local time (EET)

Third round

UEFA Champions League

Second qualifying round

Third qualifying round

Group stage

Second group stage

FIFA Club World Championship

As winners of the 2000 UEFA Super Cup, Galatasaray was one of the 12 teams that were invited to the 2001 FIFA Club World Championship, which would be hosted in Spain from 28 July to 12 August 2001. However, the tournament was canceled, primarily due to the collapse of ISL, which was a marketing partner of FIFA at the time.

Group stage

Friendlies

Attendances

References

Turkish football championship-winning seasons
Galatasaray S.K. (football) seasons
Galatasaray S.K.
2001–02 in Turkish football
2000s in Istanbul
Galatasaray Sports Club 2001–02 season